The men's shot put at the 1971 European Athletics Championships was held in Helsinki, Finland, at Helsinki Olympic Stadium on 12 and 13 August 1971.

Medalists

Results

Final
13 August

Qualification
12 August

Participation
According to an unofficial count, 23 athletes from 12 countries participated in the event.

 (2)
 (3)
 (3)
 (2)
 (3)
 (1)
 (1)
 (2)
 (1)
 (1)
 (3)
 (1)

References

Shot put
Shot put at the European Athletics Championships